David W. Coulter is an American politician serving as the County Executive of Oakland County, Michigan since 2019. A member of the Democratic Party, Coulter previously served as the mayor of Ferndale, Michigan from 2011 to 2019, and as a member of the Oakland County Board of Commissioners from 2002 to 2010.

Personal life and education
Coulter was raised in St. Clair Shores, Michigan, and attended St. Joan of Arc Grade School in the city. He graduated from Bishop Gallagher High School in Harper Woods, Michigan. Coulter earned a bachelor's degree from Michigan State University. In 2007, Coulter completed Harvard University's John F. Kennedy School of Government program for Senior Executives in State and Local Government as a David Bohnett Foundation LGBTQ Victory Institute Leadership Fellow. He is openly gay.

Career
Coulter has worked as a civil engineering draftsman and school teacher. He was employed for thirteen years by Michigan Consolidated Gas Company, served as the executive director of the Michigan AIDS Fund  and director of external affairs for the Children's Hospital of Michigan Foundation.

Coulter was elected to the Oakland County Commission in 2002, defeating a 20-year incumbent by 86 votes. He served four terms on the Commission (2002-2010), also serving as Democratic minority leader. He left the seat to run for a Michigan Senate seat in the 14th district in 2010, but lost in the primary to Vincent Gregory. Coulter was appointed Mayor of Ferndale in January 2011 after his predecessor resigned. Coulter was then elected to the two-year position in November 2011. He was re-elected in November 2013, defeating his predecessor and two other challengers. He ran unopposed to win re-election in November 2015 and 2017.

Coulter created the Mayor's Business Council in 2012, helping lead to a period of increased business and economic growth in the city.

In 2013, Coulter, along with Congressman Sander Levin, undertook a challenge in which they spent less than $4.50 a day on food. They did so to protest cuts to food stamps. The following year, Coulter became the first mayor in Michigan to perform same-sex marriages.

On August 16, 2019, the Oakland County Commission voted to appoint Coulter to serve out the remainder of Oakland County Executive L. Brooks Patterson's term as County Executive following Patterson's August 3, 2019 death from pancreatic cancer.   Coulter ran for the position in the November 2020 election, where he was a candidate for the full four-year term. He won the August, 2020 Democratic primary by defeating county treasurer Andy Meisner. He then won the November 2020 general election over former Michigan State Senator Mike Kowall, becoming the first elected Democratic county executive.

Electoral history

References

External links
Dave Coulter website

Living people
Michigan State University alumni
Harvard Kennedy School alumni
Businesspeople from Michigan
Mayors of places in Michigan
Michigan Democrats
LGBT mayors of places in the United States
LGBT people from Michigan
Year of birth missing (living people)
Place of birth missing (living people)
People from Ferndale, Michigan
Politicians from Detroit
21st-century American politicians
21st-century American LGBT people